Grady Neal Lancaster (born September 13, 1962) is an American professional golfer who has played on the PGA Tour, Nationwide Tour and the PGA Tour Champions.

Lancaster was born, raised and makes his home in Smithfield, North Carolina. He turned pro in 1985 as a completely self-taught player. Lancaster started playing on mini-tours four months in 1989 before going to Q School. He did not take his first golf lesson until 1992. His first golf lesson was given by L.B. Floyd, father of Raymond Floyd.

Lancaster has 28 top-10 finishes in 579 PGA Tour events, including a win at the 1994 GTE Byron Nelson Golf Classic, which was shortened to 36 holes due to weather. (Prior to 1996, PGA Tour events shortened to 36 holes were considered official.) His best finish in a major is a T-4 at the 1995 U.S. Open.

Lancaster shares the 9-hole record at the U.S. Open with Vijay Singh with a 29 at both the 1995 and 1996 U.S. Opens. These scores came on the back nine of the fourth and second rounds, respectively.

In 2002, Lancaster came to the final hole of the Bell Canadian Open with a two-shot lead. He made double bogey to drop into a sudden death playoff with John Rollins and Justin Leonard. Rollins won on the first extra hole. Lancaster played full-time on the PGA Tour from 1990 to 2005.

Lancaster placed fifth at the 2009 Q School tournament, but shoulder surgeries plagued him for years. He played in the 2012 Farmers Insurance Open, his first PGA Tour start since 2009. He made the cut at the FedEx St. Jude Classic, his first since the 2009 Buick Open.

After turning 50, Lancaster played his first Champions Tour event in October 2012 at the SAS Championship and finished T8 at the tour's Q school. After ending his career as a touring professional, Lancaster became a PGA professional, competing in events sanctioned through the Carolinas section of the PGA. In 2017, Lancaster won Carolinas PGA Senior Professional Championship.

Professional wins (5)

PGA Tour wins (1)

*Note: The 1994 GTE Byron Nelson Golf Classic was shortened to 36 holes due to weather.

PGA Tour playoff record (1–1)

Other wins (4)
1985 Carolinas Open
1989 Pine Tree Open, Utah Open
2017 Carolinas PGA Senior Professional Championship

Results in major championships

CUT = missed the half-way cut
"T" indicates a tie for a place

See also
1989 PGA Tour Qualifying School graduates
1990 PGA Tour Qualifying School graduates
1999 PGA Tour Qualifying School graduates
2009 PGA Tour Qualifying School graduates

References

External links

Carolinas PGA profile of Lancaster

American male golfers
PGA Tour golfers
PGA Tour Champions golfers
Golfers from North Carolina
People from Smithfield, North Carolina
1962 births
Living people